Stewart Robert Einstein (November 20, 1942 – January 2, 2019) was an American actor, comedy writer, and producer. He created and performed the satirical stuntman character Super Dave Osborne, and was also known for his roles as Marty Funkhouser in Curb Your Enthusiasm, and Larry Middleman on Arrested Development.

Einstein got his start on several television variety shows; including The Smothers Brothers Comedy Hour and The Sonny & Cher Comedy Hour. Einstein won two Emmy Awards as a writer and was nominated four other times. He also won a CableACE Award for acting as Super Dave, along with five other nominations.

Einstein was the son of radio comedian Harry Einstein, and the older brother of fellow actor and comedian Albert Brooks.

Background
Einstein was born in 1942 in Los Angeles. His parents were the comic Harry Einstein, best known for playing the character Parkyakarkus on radio and in the movies, and the actress-singer Thelma Leeds. On October 24, 1949, at the age of six, it was reported in the LA Times that he had contracted polio. His younger brother is comedian and writer Albert Brooks (born Albert Lawrence Einstein). He was a 1965 graduate of Chapman College.

Career
Einstein got his start writing for The Smothers Brothers Comedy Hour, for which he won an Emmy Award. The writing team also included Steve Martin and Murray Roman. He also appeared on the show as Officer Judy. In 1977 he won an Emmy for outstanding comedy-variety series for his work on Van Dyke and Company.

Super Dave Osborne
 
Einstein created the goofy stuntman Super Dave Osborne character for a variety show hosted by John Byner. The character later became a regular on the 1980 television series Bizarre, also hosted by Byner, and was a frequent guest on Late Night with David Letterman where he would show clips of his ill-fated stunts and tell long semi-crude jokes. In 1987, Einstein got his own variety show titled Super Dave, which ran from 1987 to 1991 on the Global Television Network in Canada (where the show was produced at the network's Toronto studio) and Showtime in the United States. In 1992, an animated series Super Dave: Daredevil for Hire aired on Fox. Einstein later extended the "Super Dave" franchise by starring in the 2000 movie The Extreme Adventures of Super Dave.

On November 12, 2009, the airing of TNA Impact!, he was the booker and host of the night. He made Super Dave's Spike Tacular, a four-episode sketch series on Spike TV reprising his Super Dave character, once again engaging in outrageous stunts.

Other roles
Einstein had recurring roles as Marty Funkhouser in Curb Your Enthusiasm and Larry Middleman in the third season of Arrested Development. He was also featured on the Comedy Central show Crank Yankers as obnoxious district selectman Tony Deloge. Einstein was also on The Man Show where he did Century Club with Adam and Jimmy. In Ocean's Thirteen he played Linus Caldwell (Matt Damon)'s father, Robert "Bobby" Caldwell, a master robber and con artist whose day job is an FBI agent.

Einstein appeared on the second season of Anger Management as Charlie Goodson's very angry neighbor, and his character in the show instantly got an unflattering nickname based on a feminine hygiene product.

Einstein voiced two characters from The Life & Times of Tim, playing the Elephant Trainer in Tim & the Elephant in the second season, and the bookie in Pray for the Jets in the third.

Einstein was the first comedian to appear twice on Jerry Seinfeld's Web series Comedians in Cars Getting Coffee.

In the 2010s, Einstein was a frequent guest on the sports talk radio program The Dan Le Batard Show with Stugotz. Einstein called in as a "Celebrity Prognosticator" to give his thoughts on sports and various other topics.

Death
Einstein died on January 2, 2019, at the age of 76, shortly after being diagnosed with cancer.

Curb Your Enthusiasm series creator and star Larry David said in a statement: “Never have I seen an actor enjoy a role the way Bob did playing ‘Marty Funkhouser’ on Curb. It was an amazing, unforgettable experience knowing and working with him. There was no one like him, as he told us again and again. We’re all in a state of shock.”

Filmography

Film

Television 
As Super Dave

Other Roles

Awards and nominations 
Primetime Emmy Awards

References

External links

20th-century American comedians
20th-century American male actors
20th-century American screenwriters
21st-century American comedians
21st-century American male actors
21st-century American screenwriters
American comedy writers
American male comedians
American male film actors
American male television actors
American male television writers
American male voice actors
American sketch comedians
Jewish American comedy writers
Jewish American screenwriters
Jewish American male actors
Jewish American male comedians
Jewish male comedians
Comedians from California
Screenwriters from California
Male actors from Los Angeles
Primetime Emmy Award winners
Chapman University alumni
American people of Austrian-Jewish descent
American people of Russian-Jewish descent
Deaths from cancer in California
1942 births
2019 deaths
21st-century American Jews